51/50 Ratchet is the debut studio album by American rapper Hurricane Chris. It was released on October 23, 2007, by Collipark Music, Go Live Entertainment, Young Mogul Entertainment, Polo Grounds Music and J Records. The album debuted at number 24 on the Billboard 200, with first week-sales of 26,000 copies in the United States.

The album was supported by three singles: "A Bay Bay", "The Hand Clap" featuring Big Poppa of The Ratchet City, and "Playas Rock" featuring Boxie.

Singles 
The album's lead single, called "A Bay Bay" was released on April 10, 2007. The song was produced by Phunk Dawg. The song peaked at number 7 on the US Billboard Hot 100.

The album's second single, called "The Hand Clap" was released on August 8, 2007. The song features guest appearance from Big Poppa of The Ratchet City, with Phunk Dawg, who also produced this track. The song peaked at number 47 on the US Billboard Hot R&B/Hip-Hop Songs.

The album's third and final single, "Playas Rock" was released on December 15, 2007. The song features guest vocals from a local singer and an American R&B recording artist Boxie, while the production was provided by Mr. Collipark.

Critical reception

51/50 Ratchet received mixed reviews from music critics. Rolling Stones Christian Hoard gave credit to the album for showcasing ratchet music and Chris's delivery, resembling that of Lil Wayne, concluding that it "eventually runs short on ideas, but not before heralding a regional sound that Hurricane Chris milks for plenty of fun." Jason Birchmeier of AllMusic noted that Chris's delivery needs more time to develop for him to go beyond being a nondescript rapper. Justin Chandler of RapReviews found the album lacking with tired production, overreliance on typical hip-hop clichés and Chris's performance doing little to distinguish himself, saying that he "has plenty of time to legitimize himself as a rapper that has more to say than the shallow surface-level stuff, but for now he seems happy with just that."

Track listing 

Notes
  indicates co-producer.

Charts

Weekly charts

Year-end charts

References 

2007 debut albums
Albums produced by Mr. Collipark
J Records albums
Hurricane Chris (rapper) albums